The Prix France Culture is a former literary award created in 1979 by the radio station France Culture.

History 
The prize was created in 1979 to reward important authors whose work was still unknown to the general public. This prize was not endowed financially but the book was promoted on the radio. In 2006, the radio joined the cultural weekly Télérama and transformed the prize into Prix France Culture/Télérama awarded under the same conditions.

In 2006, the prize is replaced by the Prix France Culture/Télérama.

List of laureates

References 

French literary awards
France Culture
Radio awards
Awards established in 1979

1979 establishments in France